Franz Oberthür (6 August 1745, in Würzburg – 30 August 1831) was a German Roman Catholic scholar who edited an 18th-century edition of Josephus once owned by Thomas Jefferson.

In 1773 he was appointed professor of dogmatics and polemics at the University of Würzburg. He is best known for his efforts involving reform within the church and the education system. In 1806 he founded the Gesellschaft zur Vervollkommung der mechanischen Künste (Society for the Perfection of Mechanical Arts).

Selected works 
 "Flavii Iosephi Hebraei Opera omnia graece et latine : excusa ad editionem Lugduno-Batauam Sigeberti Hauercampii, cum Oxoniensi Ioannis Hudsonii collatam", 1782.
 "Idea biblica ecclesiae Dei". 1790.
 Theologische Encyklopädie oder der Theologischen Wissenschaften Umfang und Zusammenhang, 1828 – Theological encyclopaedia; theological sciences scope and context.

References
Sowerby, E.M. Catalogue of the Library of Thomas Jefferson, 1952, v. 1, p. 4

1745 births
1831 deaths
Clergy from Würzburg
18th-century German Catholic theologians
Writers from Würzburg
Academic staff of the University of Würzburg
German male non-fiction writers
18th-century German writers
19th-century German writers
19th-century German male writers
18th-century German male writers